Digestion chambers are a histologic finding in nerves that are undergoing Wallerian degeneration.

Appearance
Digestion chambers consist of small globular fragments, which represent degenerating myelin sheaths.

See also
Nerve injury

References

External links
Basic Nerve Pathology (ucsf.edu) - An Introduction to the Pathology of Nerves

Neuropathology